The Telephone Girl is a 1927 American silent drama film directed by Herbert Brenon, produced by Famous Players-Lasky, released by Paramount Pictures, and based on the play The Woman (1911) by William C. deMille. This film starred Madge Bellamy, Holbrook Blinn, and Warner Baxter.

Cast
Madge Bellamy as Kitty O'Brien
Holbrook Blinn as Jim Blake
Warner Baxter as Matthew Standish
May Allison as Grace Robinson
Lawrence Gray as Tom Blake
Hale Hamilton as Mark
Hamilton Revelle as Van  Dyke 
William E. Shay as Detective
Karen Hansen as Mrs. Standish

Preservation status
This film is preserved at EYE Institut aka Filmmuseum.

References

External links

Lobby poster

1927 films
American silent feature films
American films based on plays
Paramount Pictures films
Films directed by Herbert Brenon
1927 drama films
Silent American drama films
American black-and-white films
1920s American films
Surviving American silent films